Eldon Lyon Park is the largest park owned and operated by the city of Bethany, Oklahoma. It contains many picnic tables, basketball courts, and a 1 mile track running around the perimeter of the park.

During the 4th of July, the park is home of the Bethany Freedom Celebration. The Freedom Celebration includes rides, food, crafts booths, concerts, and fireworks.

Parks in Oklahoma
Protected areas of Oklahoma County, Oklahoma